Vratišinec is a municipality in Međimurje County, Croatia.

The municipality is named after its seat, the village of Vratišinec, located around 11 kilometres north of Čakovec, the county seat of Međimurje County. The municipality also includes the village of Gornji Kraljevec and the hamlet of Remis, located between Gornji Kraljevec and Sivica.

In the 2011 census, the population of the village of Vratišinec was 1,392, while the population of the entire municipality was 1,984. The majority of the population (98%) identified themselves as Croats.

The railroad connecting Čakovec with Mursko Središće and Lendava goes through the municipality, with a small railway station located in the village of Vratišinec.

History

Vratišinec was first mentioned in 1458 as Bratrvsincz, and was originally an estate belonging to the Counts of Celje. In 1478, it was mentioned as Bratischinecz. It was also mentioned as Wratissnicz in 1636, and as Vratissinecz in 1752. The toponym is believed to have been derived from the male given name Bratiša or Vratiša, which is derived from brat, the Croatian word for "brother". It was most likely the name of a local feudal landlord.

By the 18th century, there was a wooden chapel in the village. Around 1760, the local people built a new brick chapel to replace it. At the time, the village was part of the Selnica parish. On 1 November 1789, the Vratišinec parish was established and the chapel became its parish church. The parish is named after the Exaltation of the Holy Cross.

By the beginning of the 20th century, the village was already predominantly populated by Croats. In the 1910 census, it had a population of 646. It was part of the Čakovec district of Zala County in the Kingdom of Hungary until the Treaty of Trianon was signed in 1920. It then became part of the Kingdom of Yugoslavia.

In 1941, the village became part of Hungary again, as the entire Međimurje region was annexed by the Hungarians until 1945. After World War II, it became part of Croatia within the Federal People's Republic of Yugoslavia and belonged to the Čakovec municipality until the early 1990s.

Following the independence of Croatia, the village of Vratišinec became the seat of a separate municipality, which was established in 1992. The municipality was reorganised in January 1997, with the villages of Peklenica and Križovec separating from it to become part of the wider area of the town of Mursko Središće, while Krištanovec and Žiškovec did the same to become part of the wider area of the city of Čakovec. After the reorganisation, the Vratišinec municipality includes the villages of Vratišinec and Gornji Kraljevec, and the hamlet of Remis.

In 2008, the municipality unveiled a monument to the post-World War II victims of the communist regime in Yugoslavia, as well as the local people who died defending Croatia during the Croatian War of Independence. The monument is located just outside the village of Vratišinec, across the road from the local cemetery.

Famous people
Vinko Žganec (1890–1976), a Croatian ethnomusicologist, was born in Vratišinec.

References

External links
 

Municipalities of Croatia
Populated places in Međimurje County